Daren James Puppa (born March 23, 1965) is a Canadian former professional ice hockey goaltender in the NHL. During his career, he played for the Buffalo Sabres, Tampa Bay Lightning, and the Toronto Maple Leafs. He won the 1985 NCAA Championship with the RPI Engineers. He is the cousin of NHL hockey player Ralph Backstrom.

Career biography 
Born in Kirkland Lake, Ontario, Puppa started his professional career in 1985, splitting time between the Buffalo Sabres and the AHL's Rochester Americans. Aged 20 years, 223 days, he made his NHL debut on November 1, 1985, and posted a 2-0 shutout win over the Edmonton Oilers. 
He was the starting goalie for the Amerks in the 1986-1987 season when the team won the Calder Cup.
Following the trade of Buffalo's all-star goaltender Tom Barrasso to the Pittsburgh Penguins early in the 1988–89 season, Puppa battled Jacques Cloutier to establish himself as the Sabres' number one goalie, and the following season Puppa led the league with 31 wins in 56 games. In the 1992–93 season he was traded to the Maple Leafs, but played only eight games for them before being claimed by the Lightning via the Panthers in the 1993 NHL Expansion Draft. In 1995–96.  Puppa's stellar goaltending was a major factor in the Lightning earning their first playoff berth in team history. The team took the heavily favoured Philadelphia Flyers to six games before losing in the first round. Puppa's solid goaltending in the 1995-96 season earned him his second Vezina nomination; he was second runner-up behind the ultimate winner, Jim Carey.
 
However, the next season Puppa developed chronic back trouble, and only played six games for the entire season. He only played 44 more games over the next four years, and he was forced to retire midway through the 1999–2000 season.

In addition to his 1996 nomination, Puppa also was the runner up to Patrick Roy for the 1989–1990 Vezina Trophy, awarded to the best NHL goaltender each year.

Puppa and his wife Meg have three children. The family resides in Tampa, Florida.

In 2019, Puppa returned to the ice in a game for the Buffalo Sabres Alumni Hockey Team while on a visit to Buffalo. Puppa, whose back problems and lingering effects from a 1989 shoulder injury still limit his mobility (he had not played hockey at any level since 2001 because of those injuries), led the Sabres alumni to a win.

Career statistics

Regular season and playoffs

Awards and honors

References

External links

1965 births
Living people
Adirondack Red Wings players
Buffalo Sabres draft picks
Buffalo Sabres players
Canadian ice hockey goaltenders
Ice hockey people from Ontario
National Hockey League All-Stars
Rochester Americans players
RPI Engineers men's ice hockey players
Sportspeople from Kirkland Lake
Tampa Bay Lightning players
Toronto Maple Leafs players
NCAA men's ice hockey national champions
AHCA Division I men's ice hockey All-Americans